The Carta Testamento (Letter of Testament) is a letter written by former Brazilian President Getúlio Vargas to the citizens of Brazil before his suicide. It is considered to be among the defining documents of 20th century Brazilian history. His letter read: "Nothing remains except my blood. I gave you my life, now I give you my death. I choose this way to defend you, for my soul will be with you, my name shall be a flag for your struggle.(...) Serenely, I take my first step on the road to eternity and I leave life to enter History."

Background
On the night of 24 August 1954, President Vargas was thought to be partly responsible for an assassination attempt against Carlos Lacerda, who was a leading voice opposing the Vargas policies. The suspicion was supported by the Brazilian Military and a sizeable portion of the public.

Upon receiving an ultimatum from the military demanding his resignation, Vargas went from his office into his bedroom and shot himself. He left a note, which was subsequently read to the crowds who had gathered at the presidential residence to demand his resignation. The response was a spontaneous eruption of a supportive chant: "Getúlio, Getúlio! Queremos Getúlio!" (Portuguese for "Getúlio, Getúlio! We Want Getúlio!").

See also 
Suicide note

References

External links

 Getúlio Vargas and the Estado Novo

Political history of Brazil
1955 documents
1955 in Brazil
Vargas Era